"Voices That Care" is a 1991 song written by David Foster, Linda Thompson, and Peter Cetera and recorded by a supergroup of popular musicians, entertainers and athletes. The song was released as a single on March 13, 1991 by Giant Records. The song was produced by Foster. The group of people involved was also collectively known as Voices That Care and was shown as such on the single release and marketing materials. The charity single and supporting documentary music video were intended to help boost the morale of U.S. troops involved in Operation Desert Storm, as well as supporting the International Red Cross organization.

The documentary, which followed the recording of the single to the music video's presentation to the troops in the Middle East, aired on Fox on February 28, 1991, coincidentally the day fighting in Desert Storm ended.

"Voices That Care" reached number 11 on the Billboard Hot 100 and number 6 on the Hot Adult Contemporary Tracks. In Canada, the song reached number 61.  Warren Wiebe, a friend of Foster and little-known vocalist at the time who recorded the demo of the song, was invited by Foster to sing lead and deliver the last solo lines of the song. Wiebe died on October 25, 1998 (aged 45). The music video was directed by Jim Yukich (who, three years later, helmed the movie Double Dragon) and produced by Paul Flattery for FYI (Flattery Yukich Inc.).

Formats and track listings 
4-Track CD-Single
 "Voices That Care" — 4:56
 "Voices That Care" — (demo) 4:56
 "Messages of Care" — 4:33
 "Voices That Care" (instrumental) — 3:36

Musicians at the original recording session

Lead vocalists 
The following is the order of appearance in the song:

 Ralph Tresvant 
 Randy Travis
 Celine Dion
 Peter Cetera
 Bobby Brown
 Brenda Russell
 Jani Lane
 Luther Vandross
 Garth Brooks
 Kathy Mattea
 Gunnar & Matthew Nelson
 Michael Bolton
 Pointer Sisters
 Little Richard
 Will Smith
 Mark Knopfler — guitar solo
 Kenny G — saxophone solo
 Warren Wiebe

Choir members 
In the music video, footage is shown of Ahmad Rashad, Clyde Drexler, Dominique Wilkins, David Robinson, Michael Jordan and Magic Johnson singing the song on a basketball court, but they are not present at the actual choir session. Wayne Gretzky is also seen in a brief clip.

 Marcus Allen
 Paul Anka
 Catherine Bach
 Michael Bolton
 Brian Bosworth
 Downtown Julie Brown
 Jimmy Buffett
 Gary Busey
 Gay Byrne
 Nell Carter
 David Cassidy
 Peter Cetera
 Chevy Chase
 Candy Clark
 Clarence Clemons
 Kevin Costner
 Cindy Crawford
 Billy Crystal
 Vic Damone
 Ted Danson
 Rick Dees
 Fred Dineage
 Micky Dolenz
 Clyde Drexler
 Sheena Easton
 Sally Field
 Emerson Fittipaldi
 Richard Gere
 Debbie Gibson
 Whoopi Goldberg
 Janet Gretzky
 Wayne Gretzky
 Harry Hamlin
 Mariel Hemingway
 Marilu Henner
 Orel Hershiser
 Noddy Holder
 Al Jarreau
 Magic Johnson
 Michael Jordan
 Carol Kane
 Joanna Kerns
 Don King
 Mark Knopfler
 Martin Kove
 Louie Louie
 Jon Lovitz
 Ali MacGraw
 Melissa Manchester
 Kathy Mattea
 Peter Max
 Alyssa Milano
 Dudley Moore
 Jeffrey Osborne
 Donny Osmond
 Jean-Pierre Pernaut
 Michelle Pfeiffer
 Pointer Sisters
 Sheryl Lee Ralph
 Ahmad Rashad
 Helen Reddy
 David Robinson
 Paul Rodriguez
 Kenny Rogers
 Kurt Russell
 Katey Sagal
 Fred Savage
 Jane Seymour
 William Shatner
 Nicollette Sheridan
 Brooke Shields
 Jack Smethurst
 Sissy Spacek
 Shakin' Stevens
 Stephen Stills
 Meryl Streep
 Alan Thicke
 Linda Thompson
 Tiffany
 Michael Tucker
 Mike Tyson
 Blair Underwood
 Jean-Claude Van Damme
 Luther Vandross
 Lindsay Wagner
 Roger Whittaker
 Dominique Wilkins
 Billy Dee Williams
 Warrant
 Paul Williams
 Henry Winkler
 James Woods
 Gary Wright

The band 
 David Foster – keyboards
 Simon Franglen – Synclavier programming
 Dean Parks – acoustic guitar 
 Michael Thompson – additional guitar 
 Mark Knopfler – guitar solo 
 Kenny G – saxophone solo 
 Brian Adler, Morgan Ames, Lois Blaisch, Joy Burnworth, Kenny Cetera, Barry Coffing, Marshall Connors, Laura Creamer, Randy Crenshaw, Lorraine Feather, Tim Feehan, Roger Freeland, David Freeman, Robin Hild, Peter Hix, Jeannie Jackson, Linda Jackson, Liz Jackson, Angie Jaree, David Joyce and Gael MacGregor – backing vocals

Notes and references

External links 
 

1990s ballads
1991 songs
1991 singles
All-star recordings
Charity singles
Songs written by David Foster
Songs written by Peter Cetera
Song recordings produced by David Foster
Songs written by Linda Thompson (actress)
Contemporary R&B ballads
Pop ballads
Soul ballads
Gospel songs
Giant Records (Warner) singles
Charity supergroups